Centropogon is a plant genus in the family Campanulaceae. In systems where the Lobeliaceae are recognized as distinct, Centropogon is placed there.

Selected species

 Centropogon aequatorialis
 Centropogon albostellatus
 Centropogon arcuatus
 Centropogon azuayensis
 Centropogon baezanus
 Centropogon balslevii
 Centropogon brachysiphoniatus
 Centropogon cazaletii
 Centropogon chiltasonensis
 Centropogon chontalensis
 Centropogon coccineus
 Centropogon comosus
 Centropogon cornutus
 Centropogon costaricae
 Centropogon dissectus
 Centropogon erythraeus
 Centropogon eurystomus
 Centropogon fimbriatulus
 Centropogon hartwegii
 Centropogon heteropilis
 Centropogon hirtiflorus
 Centropogon jeppesenii
 Centropogon licayensis
 Centropogon llanganatensis
 Centropogon medusa
 Centropogon nigricans
 Centropogon occultus
 Centropogon papillosus
 Centropogon parviflorus
 Centropogon phoeniceus
 Centropogon pilalensis
 Centropogon quebradanus
 Centropogon rimbachii
 Centropogon rubiginosus
 Centropogon rubrodentatus
 Centropogon saltuum
 Centropogon sodiroanus
 Centropogon solanifolius
 Centropogon solisii
 Centropogon steinii
 Centropogon steyermarkii
 Centropogon subandinus
 Centropogon talamancensis
 Centropogon tortilis
 Centropogon trachyanthus
 Centropogon trichodes
 Centropogon uncinatus
 Centropogon ursinus
 Centropogon zamorensis

 
Campanulaceae genera
Taxonomy articles created by Polbot